Stormy Kendrick (born January 6, 1991) is an American sprinter who specialises in the 100 and 200 metres. She won two gold medals at the 2010 World Junior Championships in Athletics.

Career

At the 2010 World Junior Championships in Athletics, Kendrick won gold in the 200 metres in a personal best time of 22.99 s. Kendrick then combined with Takeia Pinckney, Dezerea Bryant, and Ashley Collier in the 4x100 metres relay to finish first ahead of Germany and the Netherlands.

Personal bests

References

External links

Official bio at Clemson University

1991 births
Living people
American female sprinters
21st-century American women